Johan Fredrik Kjellén  (1881–1959) was a Swedish politician. He was a member of the Centre Party.

References
This article was initially translated from the Swedish Wikipedia article.

Centre Party (Sweden) politicians
1881 births
1959 deaths